"Really Wanna Know You" is a 1981 song by Gary Wright that was a hit single in the U.S., reaching No. 16 on the Billboard Hot 100. It was taken from the album The Right Place.  The song spent 17 weeks on the chart and became Wright's third biggest U.S. hit.  It was his final charting single.

Billboard ranked "Really Wanna Know You" as the No. 96th biggest hit of 1981.  In Canada, the song reached No. 14.

Chart performance

Weekly singles charts

Year-end charts

References

External links
 

1981 singles
Gary Wright songs
Songs written by Gary Wright
1981 songs
Warner Records singles